De tú a tú (From You to You) was a Spanish television program broadcast by Antena 3 from 1990 to 1993. It was presented by the journalist Nieves Herrero.

Format
It also featured television series such as La intrusa, General Hospital, and Peyton Place.

Beginning on 26 February 1991, the show had a night edition, broadcast on Tuesdays, and premiered with an interview of Camilo José Cela. A month later, the daily morning edition was canceled.

Alcàsser Girls case

On 28 January 1993, De tú a tú was broadcast live from the Valencian town of Alcàsser, after the bodies of the girls Miriam García, Antonia Gómez, and Desirée Hernández, were found there. The presenter interviewed the grieving parents of García and Gómez, reaching a ratings share of 16% (twice its usual score).

The broadcast ignited controversy, eliciting numerous opinion articles in newspapers and magazines, letters to the editor, and even books, and opened a debate on the limits of journalistic ethics. The event marked a turning point in Herrero's career; in an interview she admitted that she came to consider leaving the journalistic profession in the face of the wave of criticism, and years later she still recognized that it was the worst moment of her professional life.

References

External links
 

1990s Spanish television series
1990 Spanish television series debuts
1993 Spanish television series endings
Antena 3 (Spanish TV channel) original programming